458 may refer to:

The number 458

Dates
The year 458 AD
The year 458 BC

Places
The area code 458
458 Hercynia, a main-belt asteroid, the 458th asteroid registered
Rural Municipality of Willow Creek No. 458, Saskatchewan, Canada; no. 458 rural municipality named Willow Creek
Montgomery No. 458, Alberta, Canada; no. 458 municipal district named Montgomery
Road 458, see List of highways numbered 458

Transportation
The Ferrari 458, an automobile produced by Ferrari
British Rail Class 458, electric multiple unit passenger train

Other uses
No. 458 (SPARTAN II id code), personal name Nicole, a fictional character from DOA/HALO crossover; see List of Dead or Alive characters

Firearm Cartridges
.458 Winchester Magnum
.458 SOCOM
.458 Express
.458 Lott
.458 HAM'R
.458×2-inch American

See also

 
 458th (disambiguation)